Pseudofistulina is a genus of fungi in the family Fistulinaceae. It was circumscribed in 1962 by Oswaldo and Maria Fidalgo.

References

External links

Fistulinaceae
Agaricales genera